McDougall Hospital was a U.S. Army military hospital located at Fort Schuyler in New York City before and during the American Civil War.

The hospital was opened in October, 1862 until being temporarily closed on February, 1864. The hospital received 4,505 patients during that time period. It was reopened in May, 1864 and permanently closed in September 1865.  The hospital received 7,587 patients during that time period.  It had a capacity of 2,000 beds.  In October 1863, the hospital was "to be removed without delay"; it was one of the oldest of the U.S. military hospitals. During the Civil War, about 16% of its patients were lost by desertion and failure to return from furlough.

In the Fall of 1864, the hospital housed 1600 patients. By the time that it was closed, in September, 1865, the hospital had received a total of 12,092 patients.

References

See also 
 List of former United States Army medical units
 New York City in the American Civil War

New York (state) in the American Civil War
American Civil War hospitals
Closed medical facilities of the United States Army
Closed installations of the United States Army
Defunct hospitals in the Bronx
History of the Bronx
Throggs Neck, Bronx
Installations of the United States Army in New York (state)
Military facilities in the Bronx